The Brown Bi-visible is an attractor style dry fly.  The addition of light cream colored or white hackle at the front of the darker body made the Bi-visible easier for the angler to see on the water. Ray Bergman in his seminal 1952 work Trout gave the following credit to the Bi-visible pattern:

Origin
Edward Ringwood Hewitt believed darker colored flies were more easily seen by trout but were more difficult to see by anglers in low light conditions. The addition of light-colored cream or white hackle to the front of the darker brown palmered hackle made the fly more visible to both the trout and the angler.

In the 1930s and 1940s, prominent anglers and fly tiers like Ray Bergman, Rube Cross and Walt and Winnie Dettes promoted the Bi-Visible and created a number of variations. Rube Cross in The Complete Fly Tier (1936) dedicates an entire chapter to the Bi-visible style.

Imitates
The Bi-visible is an attractor style dry fly. Flies are called attractor patterns because in theory, they do not resemble any specific prey, but instead attract strikes from fish.  Paul Schullery in American Fly Fishing – A History (1996) explains however that although much has been written about the imitation theories of fly design, all successful fly patterns must imitate something to the fish, and even a perfect imitation attracts strikes from fish.

Materials
 Hook-dry fly hook (size 8-18)
 Thread-black or brown
 Hackle-white or cream dry fly hackle
 Tail-brown hackle fibers
 Body-brown dry fly hackle wound full

Variations
As described by Mike Valla in The Founding Flies
 Royal Coachman Bi-visible
 Badger Bi-visible
 Gordon Quill Bi-visible
 Blue Bi-visible
 Olive Bi-Visible
 Light Cahill Bi-visible
 Gray Grizzle Bi-visible
 Black Bi-visible

Notes

 
Dry fly patterns